gamma-Linolenic acid or GLA (γ-linolenic acid) (INN: gamolenic acid) is a fatty acid found primarily in seed oils. When acting on GLA, arachidonate 5-lipoxygenase produces no leukotrienes and the conversion by the enzyme of arachidonic acid to leukotrienes is inhibited.

Chemistry
GLA is categorized as an n−6 (also called ω−6 or omega-6) fatty acid, meaning that the first double bond on the methyl end (designated with n or ω) is the sixth bond. In physiological literature, GLA is designated as 18:3 (n−6). GLA is a carboxylic acid with an 18-carbon chain and three cis double bonds. It is an isomer of α-linolenic acid, which is a polyunsaturated n−3 (omega-3) fatty acid, found in rapeseed canola oil, soybeans, walnuts, flax seed (linseed oil), perilla, chia, and hemp seed.

History
GLA was first isolated from the seed oil of evening primrose.  This herbal plant was grown by Native Americans to treat swelling in the body.
In the 17th century, it was introduced to Europe and became a popular folk remedy, earning the name king's cure-all.
In 1919, Heiduschka and Lüft extracted the oil from evening primrose seeds and described an unusual linolenic acid, which they name γ-.
Later, the exact chemical structure was characterized by Riley.

Although there are α- and γ- forms of linolenic acid, there is no β- form.  One was once identified, but it turned out to be an artifact of the original analytical process.

Dietary sources
GLA is obtained from vegetable oils such as evening primrose (Oenothera biennis) oil (EPO), blackcurrant seed oil, borage seed oil, and hemp seed oil. GLA is also found in varying amounts in edible hemp seeds, oats, barley, and  spirulina. Normal safflower (Carthamus tinctorius) oil does not contain GLA, but a genetically modified GLA safflower oil available in commercial quantities since 2011 contains 40% GLA. Borage oil contains 20% GLA, evening primrose oil ranges from 8% to 10% GLA, and black-currant oil contains 15-20%.

The human body produces GLA from linoleic acid (LA). This reaction is catalyzed by Δ6-desaturase (D6D), an enzyme that allows the creation of a double bond on the sixth carbon counting from the carboxyl terminus.  LA is consumed sufficiently in most diets, from such abundant sources as cooking oils and meats. However, a lack of GLA can occur when there is a reduction of the efficiency of the D6D conversion (for instance, as people grow older or when there are specific dietary deficiencies) or in disease states wherein there is excessive consumption of GLA metabolites.

Source of eicosanoids

From GLA, the body forms dihomo-γ-linolenic acid (DGLA). This is one of the body's three sources of eicosanoids (along with AA and EPA.) DGLA is the precursor of the prostaglandin PGH1, which in turn forms PGE1 and the thromboxane TXA1. Both PGE11 and TXA1 are anti-inflammatory; thromboxane TXA1, unlike its series-2 variant, induces vasodilation, and inhibits platelet consequently, TXA1 modulates (reduces) the pro-inflammatory properties of the thromboxane TXA2. PGE1 has a role in regulation of immune system function and is used as the medicine alprostadil.

Unlike AA and EPA, DGLA cannot yield leukotrienes.  However, it can inhibit the formation of pro-inflammatory leukotrienes from AA.

Although GLA is an n−6 fatty acid, a type of acid that is, in general, pro-inflammatory, it has anti-inflammatory properties. (See discussion at Essential fatty acid interactions: The paradox of dietary GLA.)

Topical use

In 2002, the UK Medicines and Healthcare products Regulatory Agency withdrew marketing authorisations for evening primrose oil as an eczema remedy.

Notes and references

5α-Reductase inhibitors
Fatty acids
Alkenoic acids